This is a list of all Grand Prix tournaments, which have been held for the Magic: The Gathering game. By the end of 2018, 654 Grand Prix events have been held. From the beginning of 2019, Grand Prix events became a part of a larger event, named MagicFests.

List of Grand Prix 

Key

Grand Prix by country 

The totals for each of the three columns will be different from each other, for several reasons:

 Team Grand Prix have multiple winners, possibly from different countries.
 The same individual may win multiple Grand Prix.
 Future Grand Prix will already have been scheduled at a host city but not yet have a winner.

See also 

Grand Prix
The DCI

References